Bernard Duane McGarry (December 24, 1917 – March 25, 2001) was an American football guard. He played college football for the University of Utah and professional football for the Cleveland Rams.

Early years
A native of Park City, Utah, he was an all-state football player at Park City High School He next played college football for Utah. He was the captain of the 1938 Utah Utes football team that won the Mountain States Conference champion and defeated New Mexico in the 1939 Sun Bowl.

Professional football
He was drafted by the Cleveland Rams in the sixth round (43rd overall pick) of the 1939 NFL Draft. He appeared in 37 games, 28 as a starter, for the Rams from 1939 to 1942.

Family and later years
McGarry was married in 1941 to Relva Johnson. After retiring from football, he worked as a floor coverings contractor. She died in 1980, and he married Margarett Bramwell in 1983. He died in 2001 at age 83 in Provo, Utah.

References

1917 births
2001 deaths
Cleveland Rams players
Utah Utes football players
Players of American football from Utah